Abdurahman Mesaad (Arabic:عبد الرحمن مسعد; born 14 March 1996) is a Qatari footballer. He currently plays for Lusail .

External links

References

Qatari footballers
1996 births
Living people
Al-Wakrah SC players
Lusail SC players
Qatar Stars League players
Qatari Second Division players
Place of birth missing (living people)
Association football defenders